J. Paul Brown (born February 28, 1953) is an American businessman, rancher, and politician who served as a member of the Colorado House of Representatives for the 59th district from 2015 to 2017. A Republican, Brown was defeated for re-election in 2016 by Barbara McLachlan.

Early life and education 
Brown was born in the Four Corners region. He earned a Bachelor of Science degree in animal science from New Mexico State University in 1975.

Career 
Brown was elected to the Colorado House of Representatives in 2010. He was defeated for re-election in 2012, and succeeded by Mike McLachlan. He defeated McLachlan in 2014 and regained his seat, serving until 2017. He was defeated for re-election by McLauchlan's wife, Barbara McLachlan. Brown also served as a commissioner of La Plata County, and on the Ignacio, Colorado school board.

Personal life 
Brown and his wife, Debbie, have four children.

References 

Living people
1953 births
American ranchers
Ranchers from Colorado
New Mexico State University alumni
Republican Party members of the Colorado House of Representatives